Miri language can refer to:
 Mishing language (Plains Miri)
 Hill Miri language
 Miri language (Sudan)
 a dialect of the Waitaká language
 a dialect of the Narom language

See also
Miri (disambiguation)